Peter Valeur (27 July 1847 - 3 August 1922) was a Norwegian politician for the Coalition Party.  Born in Bergen, he embarked on a career in the military, parallel with law studies. He graduated as cand.jur. in 1873. After a series of civil jobs he settled in Kristiansand in 1892 as a postmaster.

He was a member of Kristiansand city council for an unknown period. He was elected to the Norwegian Parliament in 1907, representing the constituency of Fæstningen but served only one term.

References

1847 births
1922 deaths
Members of the Storting
Coalition Party (Norway) politicians
Politicians from Kristiansand